Blue Lake Regional Park is a public park in Fairview, in the U.S. state of Oregon. The  park, near the south shore of the Columbia River in Multnomah County, includes many covered and uncovered picnic areas, playing fields for sports such as softball, a cross country course (home course for Portland State Vikings cross country) and infrastructure related to lake recreation including swimming, boating, and fishing. Encompassing wooded areas, three ponds, and a wetland in addition to the lake, the park is frequented by migrating birds and other wildlife. Paved paths run through the park, which is near the 40-Mile Loop hiking and biking trail. Park vegetation includes cottonwoods, willows, and other trees and shrubs as well as wetland plants such as cattails.

The  lake, which lies in a small artificial drainage basin, has no natural inlet or outlet. Water normally enters the lake only from rain, surface runoff, and groundwater seepage. Excessive aquatic plant life and algae have sometimes restricted the use of the lake, and its maintenance includes plant control and addition of fresh water from municipal wells.

Location
Metro, the regional government for the Oregon part of the Portland metropolitan area, manages the  park.
Marine Drive and the 40-Mile Loop hiking and biking trail pass north of the park, between it and the river. South of Blue Lake beyond Interlachen Lane is Fairview Lake 

History
William Clark of the Lewis and Clark Expedition stopped here on his return trip in April 1806, and learned from members of the Nichaqwli (or Nechacokee or Ne-cha-co-lee) of the Willamette River.  The site was a private park from the 1920s to 1960 when Multnomah County purchased it.  Metro took over the operation of Multnomah County's parks on January 1, 1994, and received ownership of them in 1996.  A dance hall existed until after Multnomah County's takeover.

Amenities
 Amenities include public restrooms, wheelchair accessibility for most areas, trails, parking, sheltered picnic areas and tables, interpretive signs, and concessions. Activities at the park include hiking, biking, cross country running, swimming, boating, fishing, wildlife viewing, volleyball, basketball, disc golf, archery, and softball. The park has a water-spray playground of about  that uses municipal well water that is treated and recycled at the park. Sculptures at the west end of the lake commemorate former Chinook villages along the Columbia River. For a fee, Metro offers the use of a  structure called The Lake House for banquets, conferences, receptions, recitals, and weddings. The Oregon Department of Fish and Wildlife stocks Blue Lake annually with trout.

Wetland plants near ponds north and west of the lake include cattails and rushes that provide habitat for marsh birds such as red-winged blackbirds. Swallows are common in summer, and American goldfinches and other migratory birds visit the park in large number. Cottonwoods, alders, dogwoods, willows, and conifers grow in the park as do many shrubs including elderberries, spiraea, and Oregon-grape. The park is frequented by muskrats, voles, raccoons, and the occasional coyote.

Hydrology
Its shoreline totals .
 
Having no surface inlet, the lake receives water naturally only from rain, surface runoff, and groundwater seepage. Three small ponds, connected to the lake and to one another by culverts, lie just north of the lake at its west end. Outflow from lake and ponds occurs only when workers release water through a concrete weir to Salmon Creek, in a separate drainage basin to the east. From there the water flows into the Columbia River.

The closed nature of the lake contributes to reduced water quality. Invasive aquatic plants such as Eurasian watermilfoil and curlyleaf pondweed have sometimes restricted use of the lake for swimming, fishing, and boating. In 1998, the Oregon Department of Environmental Quality (DEQ) added the lake to its list of impaired water bodies because it violated the state's standard for alkalinity and supported too many aquatic weeds and algae. As of June 2008, efforts to  control weeds without damaging favored plants and other aspects of the lake were continuing.

See also
 List of lakes in Oregon
 Oxbow Regional Park
 Cooper Mountain Nature Park
 Interlachen, Oregon – situated just south of the park

References

Works cited
 Houck, Mike, and Cody, M.J., eds. (2000). Wild in the City. Portland, Oregon: Oregon Historical Society Press. .
Pfauth, Mary, and Sytsma, Mark (2004). "Integrated Aquatic Vegetation Management Plan for Blue Lake, Fairview, Oregon" (pdf). Portland, Oregon: Center for Lakes and Reservoirs, Environmental Sciences and Resources, Portland State University. Retrieved on January 1, 2009.

External links

 Blue Lake Regional Park | Metro
 Interlachen Home Owners Association

Lakes of Oregon
Parks in Multnomah County, Oregon
Parks in Oregon
College cross country courses in the United States
Cross country running courses in Oregon
Portland State Vikings
Landforms of Multnomah County, Oregon
Lakes of Multnomah County, Oregon
Wetlands of Oregon